Julie Johnson (born July 3, 1991) is an American writer based in Boston. Johnson is best known for her contemporary romance novels, including the Girl Duet series and the Boston Love Stories series.

Career
Johnson was born in Nahant, Massachusetts, where she spent her childhood. In December 2013, Johnson obtained a BA honors from University of Delaware with degrees in Mass Communications and Psychology from the College of Arts and Sciences. In 2013, Julie published her first novel Like Gravity. After the publication of her first novel, Johnson graduated with honors from University of Delaware.

Johnson is the author of over 18 novels. Her books have been published in at least eight languages.

Selected novels
 Like Gravity, (2013)
 Say the Word, (2014)
 Erasing Faith, (2014)
 Not You It's Me, (2015)
 Cross the Line, (2015)
 Love & Lies, (2016)
 One Good Reason, (2016)
 The Monday Girl, (2016)
 The Someday Girl, (2017)
 Take Your Time, (2017)
 Uncharted, (2018)
Faded: Part One (2018)
Faded: Part Two (2018) 
 So Wrong It's Right (2018) 
 Dirty Halo (2019) 
 Torrid Throne (2019) 
 Sordid Empire (2020) 
 We Don't Talk Anymore (2020) 
We Don't Lie Anymore (2020)

References

Other websites
 Official website

1991 births
Living people
Writers from Boston
People from Nahant, Massachusetts